South Africa's Official Opposition Shadow Cabinet (Southern Ndebele: ikhabinethi elingisako; ; ;) consists of Members of the National Assembly who scrutinise their corresponding office holders in the executive branch of government and develop alternative policies for their respective portfolios. The Democratic Alliance (DA) retained their position as official opposition in the 2019 general election and Mmusi Maimane announced his shadow cabinet on 5 June 2019. 

Mmusi Maimane resigned as Leader of the Opposition in October 2019. John Steenhuisen was elected as his successor and leads the Official Opposition Shadow Cabinet. Appointed alongside Steenhuisen was Natasha Mazzone, as Chief Whip, and Annelie Lotriet as Chairperson of the Caucus. Steenhuisen announced his shadow cabinet on 5 December 2020.

Members of the Shadow Cabinet

Other shadow cabinets
 Shadow Cabinet of Mmusi Maimane (2014–2019)
 Shadow Cabinet of Lindiwe Mazibuko (2011–2014)
 Shadow Cabinet of Athol Trollip (2009–2011)
 Shadow Cabinet of Sandra Botha (2007–2009)
 Shadow Cabinet of Tony Leon

References 

South African shadow cabinets
South Africa